This list of aircraft at the Royal Air Force Museum Cosford summarises the collection of aircraft that is housed at the Royal Air Force Museum Cosford.

Collection

External display

Test Flight

War in the Air

National Cold War Exhibition

Hangar 1

Previously on display

See also
 Royal Air Force Museum London
 List of aircraft at the Royal Air Force Museum London

References

Aerospace museums in England
Royal Air Force Museum Cosford
Cosford